The Orlando Opera was Orlando, Florida's professional opera company, founded in 1958. The opera performed multiple times a year in the Bob Carr Performing Arts Centre and other venues in the central Florida region. On April 16, 2009 the company announced it will suspend all operations and close its doors due to poor economic conditions. The company filed Chapter 7 bankruptcy.

Musical groups from Orlando, Florida
American opera companies
Companies that have filed for Chapter 7 bankruptcy
Musical groups established in 1958
Musical groups disestablished in 2009
1958 establishments in Florida
2009 disestablishments in Florida